Henry Blomfield Burnell (14 November 1853 — 19 October 1910) was an English first-class cricketer and barrister.

The son of Blomfield Burnell, he was born at Upper Clapton in November 1853. He was educated at Harrow School, before going up to Christ's College, Cambridge. A student of Lincoln's Inn, he was called to the bar in May 1879. In the same year he made played in a first-class cricket match for the Marylebone Cricket Club against Kent at Tunbridge Wells. Batting once in the match, he was dismissed for a single run by Edward O'Shaughnessy. Burnell died at St John's Wood in October 1910.

References

External links

1853 births
1910 deaths
People from Upper Clapton
People educated at Harrow School
Alumni of Christ's College, Cambridge
English cricketers
Marylebone Cricket Club cricketers
Members of Lincoln's Inn